Justin Blood (born November 20, 1979) is an American baseball coach and former player, who is the current head baseball coach of the Keene State Owls. He played college baseball at Frankin Pierce from 1999 to 2001. He then served as the head coach of the Hartford Hawks (2012–2021).

Playing career
Blood pitched for three seasons at Franklin Pierce. In 2000, he played collegiate summer baseball with the Orleans Cardinals of the Cape Cod Baseball League. Blood become the first baseball player ever drafted from Franklin Pierce, being selected by the Seattle Mariners in the 9th round of the 2001 MLB Draft.  He played three seasons in the Mariners organization, reaching Class-A.

Coaching career
After ending his playing career, Blood became an assistant coach at Quinnipiac before spending the next two years at Franklin Pierce completing his degree and serving as a student assistant.  From 2006 through 2011, Blood served on the staff of Jim Penders at UConn, later adding recruiting coordinator and associate head coach duties.  He was responsible for recruiting players including Mike Olt, Matt Barnes, and George Springer, and helped the Huskies to a pair of regionals and a super regional while his pitching staffs ranked among the nation's best.  He was hired at Hartford during the Huskies 2011 NCAA Tournament run, and has been tabbed one of the nation's top 10 under 40 head coaches by Baseball America.

In 2012 and 2013, Blood's first two seasons at Hartford, the Hawks had losing records and missed the conference tournament.  In 2014, however, Hartford went 31–23 and qualified for the America East Tournament, where they went 1–2.  It was Hartford's first winning season since 1992 and first postseason appearance since 1996.  Following the season, Blood signed a five-year contract extension through the 2019 season.

Head coaching record
This table depicts Blood's record as a head coach.

References

External links

Official Biography, Hartford Hawks

Living people
1979 births
Baseball pitchers
People from Keene, New Hampshire
UConn Huskies baseball coaches
Everett AquaSox players
Franklin Pierce Ravens baseball coaches
Franklin Pierce Ravens baseball players
Orleans Firebirds players
Hartford Hawks baseball coaches
Inland Empire 66ers of San Bernardino players
Quinnipiac Bobcats baseball coaches
San Bernardino Stampede players
Baseball coaches from New Hampshire
Keene State Owls baseball coaches